The New York Liberty are an American professional basketball team based in the New York City borough of Brooklyn. The Liberty compete in the Women's National Basketball Association (WNBA) as part of the league's Eastern Conference. The team was founded in 1997 and is one of the eight original franchises of the league. The team is owned by Joe Tsai, the majority owner of the Brooklyn Nets. The team's home games are played at Barclays Center.

The Liberty have qualified for the WNBA Playoffs in seventeen of its twenty-six years. The franchise has been home to many well-known players such as Teresa Weatherspoon, Rebecca Lobo, Becky Hammon, Leilani Mitchell, Essence Carson, Cappie Pondexter, Tina Charles, and the team's first-ever No.1 overall Draft pick Sabrina Ionescu. The Liberty have three conference championships and have played in the WNBA Finals four times, falling to the Houston Comets in 1997, 1999, and 2000, and losing to the Los Angeles Sparks in 2002. They have the most appearances in the WNBA Finals without a championship.  They are also the oldest franchise in the WNBA without a championship.

Franchise history

Early success (1997–2002)
Prior to the team's first season, to avoid potential trademark infringement, the team purchased the trademarks of the defunct Liberty Basketball Association.

When the WNBA opened in 1997, the Liberty were one of the first teams to choose a player, and they signed college superstar Rebecca Lobo (UConn) to a contract. Lobo was a starter for two seasons, but was injured in 1999. Her injuries eventually led to her retirement several seasons later. Point guard Teresa Weatherspoon emerged as a star, and the Liberty made it to the 1997 championship game, where the team lost to the Houston Comets. In 1999, they added Crystal Robinson with the 6th overall pick and returned to the WNBA Finals, where they again faced the Comets. In Game 2, Teresa Weatherspoon's halfcourt shot at the buzzer gave the Liberty a one-point road win that tied the series at a game apiece. However, the Liberty lost the third game of the series and the Comets became champions for a third straight time.

In 2000, the Liberty traded for Tari Phillips who blossomed in New York and made four straight All-Star teams. In 2001, Weatherspoon became the WNBA's all-time assist leader. Teamed with Robinson, Phillips and an emerging Sue Wicks, who was once a back-up to Lobo at forward but made the 2000 All-Star game, Weatherspoon and the Liberty subsequently returned to the finals in 2000 and 2002, but lost once again to the Comets and to the Los Angeles Sparks, respectively. The Liberty also advanced to the WNBA Eastern Conference Finals in 2001.

Transition seasons (2003–2009)

The 2003 season marked a transition for the Liberty and with team leader Teresa Weatherspoon's WNBA career winding down, fan favorite Becky Hammon emerged as a star player. The 2004 season saw Hammon replacing Weatherspoon as the team's starting point guard.

The Liberty played six of their home games during the 2004 season at Radio City Music Hall as Madison Square Garden was hosting the 2004 Republican National Convention. These games marked the first time Radio City had hosted a professional sporting event since the Roy Jones Jr. boxing match held in 1999.

With team leader Tari Phillips being signed away to the Houston Comets, Ann Wauters emerged as a force at the team's starting center position in 2005. However, she was unfortunately injured midway through the season. The loss of Wauters was felt as the team was swept two games to none by the Indiana Fever in the first round of the playoffs.

The Liberty had a poor 2006 season, winning only 11 games, the fewest in franchise history.

At the beginning of the 2007 WNBA season, the team traded Becky Hammon to the San Antonio Silver Stars for Jessica Davenport, a first round pick in the 2007 WNBA Draft. They also acquired center Janel McCarville through the dispersal draft associated with the dissolution of the Charlotte Sting. The 2007 Liberty started out 5–0, then lost 7 straight games, then rallied at the end of the season to get the last playoff spot by winning 3 out of their last 4 games, beating the Washington Mystics on the tiebreaker of head-to-head record. In the Eastern Conference semifinals, the Liberty, as huge underdogs, faced the defending champion Detroit Shock in a best-of-three series. The Liberty defeated the Shock by winning Game 1 in New York. In Games 2 and 3 the Liberty lost both games to the Shock in Detroit, 76–73 and 71–70 (OT) respectively.

In 2008, the Liberty drafted former Rutgers shooting guard Essence Carson and former North Carolina forward Erlana Larkins, and signed former Utah point guard Leilani Mitchell during the preseason. Despite having the youngest average age of any WNBA team, the Liberty managed to win 19 regular season games in 2008, to defeat the Connecticut Sun in the first round of playoff action, and to come within two points of defeating the Detroit Shock in the third and last game of the Eastern Conference Finals. Again, the Detroit series entailed a Liberty victory at home in Game 1, followed by narrow defeats away in Games 2 and 3. The 2008 season also featured the "Liberty Outdoor Classic", the first ever professional regular season basketball game to be played outdoors, on July 19 at Arthur Ashe Stadium of the USTA Billie Jean King National Tennis Center. The Indiana Fever defeated the Liberty in the Outdoor Classic.

In the 2009 WNBA Draft, the Liberty selected local favorite Kia Vaughn from Rutgers. With a solid core group, the Liberty looked to be a contender in the East yet again.

In the 2009 season, however, they never proved to be a contender and the team fired head coach Pat Coyle. To replace Coyle, the Liberty hired then-Liberty assistant coach Anne Donovan on an interim basis. Despite the coaching change, the franchise continued to struggle, finishing 13–21, their second worst record in franchise history.

The Cappie Pondexter era (2010–2014)
The New York Liberty fared better in 2010, during Donovan's first and only full season as head coach. Led by newly signed high scorer Cappie Pondexter (formerly of the Phoenix Mercury) and the 2010 Most Improved Player Award winner Leilani Mitchell, the team made it all the way to the Eastern Conference Finals, where they lost to the Atlanta Dream.

The team had high hopes for 2011, after the hiring of former WNBA champion head coach John Whisenant. Janel McCarville did not report to training camp, seeking time with her family, and as such, was suspended for the duration of the 2011 season. This caused division and discord within the New York Liberty fanbase. Kia Vaughn was unexpectedly thrust into the role of starting Center.

The Liberty were originally scheduled to be displaced from their usual home court due to renovations at Madison Square Garden scheduled to begin in 2009. However, the renovation plans were delayed, and the Liberty played at the Garden in 2009 and 2010. The Liberty ended up playing in the Prudential Center in Newark, New Jersey, for their 2011, 2012, and 2013 seasons while the renovations were ongoing.

Pondexter and Plenette Pierson, along with improved play from Vaughn, allowed New York to be competitive early in the 2011 season. The team went into the All-Star break in third place in the Eastern Conference. In August, Sidney Spencer was traded to the Phoenix Mercury in exchange for Kara Braxton. By maintaining a fairly even standard of play, the Liberty made their way into the WNBA Playoffs. However, the Liberty fell to the Indiana Fever in the Eastern Conference Semifinals.

The Isiah Thomas era (2015–2018)
On May 5, 2015, the Liberty hired Thomas as Team President overseeing all business and basketball operations of the franchise. Under Thomas' leadership as team president and the coaching staff led by Bill Laimbeer as head coach, the Liberty finished first in the Eastern Conference during the 2015 season.

On August 2, 2015, during halftime at the game against the Seattle Storm, the New York Liberty inducted WNBA legend Becky Hammon into the Liberty's Ring of Honor. Thomas presented Hammon with her ring during the induction ceremony at Madison Square Garden. Hammon is currently the head coach of the WNBA's Las Vegas Aces. 

After qualifying for the 2016 WNBA Playoffs, the Liberty lost to the Phoenix Mercury in the second round.

In November 2017, the Madison Square Garden Company and James L. Dolan announced they were actively looking to sell the franchise. After not immediately finding a buyer, MSG relocated most of the Liberty's 2018 home games to Westchester County Center in nearby White Plains, New York, the home of MSG's NBA G League team the Westchester Knicks, while still continuing to pursue a sale.

The Joseph Tsai era (2019–present) 
On January 23, 2019, the Liberty were sold to Joseph Tsai, co-founder of the Alibaba Group, a Chinese internet company, who then owned 49% of the NBA's Brooklyn Nets. Isiah Thomas was relieved of his duties a month later, on February 21, 2019. During the 2019 season, the Liberty played two games in Brooklyn at the Nets' home of the Barclays Center, with the rest still in White Plains. Later that year, Tsai became the sole owner of the Nets and the Barclays Center. For the 2020 season, Tsai relocated the Liberty to Brooklyn on a full-time basis.

The Liberty were major players in the 2020 WNBA draft, entering that draft with three first-round picks plus two in the early second round. Shortly before the draft, they traded former league MVP Tina Charles to the Washington Mystics in a deal that also involved the Dallas Wings. They chose Sabrina Ionescu as the first pick, with Megan Walker and Jazmine Jones selected later in that round. The team also introduced a new logo, featuring a simplified version of their Statue of Liberty branding. The color black was also made one of the primary colors, echoing the aesthetic of their NBA brother squad, the Brooklyn Nets.

The Liberty began the 2020 season, held in a "bubble" in Bradenton, Florida, due to the COVID-19 pandemic, with seven rookies on their opening-night roster. The team suffered a major blow in their third game, in which Ionescu suffered a severe ankle sprain that ultimately ended her season. The Liberty ended the season with a league-worst 2–20 record. Despite the lack of wins, one of the first-year players, 12th overall pick Jazmine Jones, was named to the Associated Press and WNBA's All-Rookie teams.  

The Liberty made major splashes during the 2021 offseason. Prior to its first season as full-time tenants of Barclays Center, the Liberty added WNBA champions Natasha Howard and Sami Whitcomb in a multi-team trade that sent Kia Nurse and Megan Walker to the Phoenix Mercury  and signed Betnijah Laney, the league's 2020 Most Improved Player Award winner.  The team then added Michaela Onyenwere and DiDi Richards in the 2021 WNBA Draft. Laney would represent the Liberty at the 2021 WNBA All-Star Game while Onyenwere won the Associated Press' Rookie of the Year Award. New York finished the year with a 12–20 record but the 10-game improvement in the win column was enough to push the team into the WNBA Playoffs for the first time since 2017. Seeded eighth, the Liberty put up a valiant effort against No. 5 Phoenix in the opening but fell by an 83–82 final.

On December 6, 2021, the Liberty and head coach Walt Hopkins Jr. parted ways. The team would hire former Phoenix head coach Sandy Brondello in his place just over a month later on January 7, 2022. On the roster, the team brought in Stefanie Dolson of the defending champion Chicago Sky and drafted Nyara Sabally fifth overall, though the latter would miss her whole rookie season with an injury. In Brondello's first season at the helm, the team was forced to overcome an early injury to Laney and got off to a 1-7 start. But the All-Star efforts of Ionescu and Howard kept the team afloat and they would end the season on a three-game winning streak to secure its second consecutive playoff berth.

Season-by-season records

Statistics

|-
! style="width:8%;" |PPG
! style="width:8%;" |RPG
! style="width:8%;" |APG
! style="width:8%;" |PPG
! style="width:8%;" |RPG
! style="width:8%;" |FG%
|-
| 1997
| S. Witherspoon (14.5)
| R. Lobo (7.3)
| T. Weatherspoon (6.1)
| 68.3 vs 65.9
| 32.9 vs 33.3
| .412 vs .391
|-
| 1998
| S. Witherspoon (13.8)
| R. Lobo (6.9)
| T. Weatherspoon (6.4)
| 68.6 vs 65.5
| 31.5 vs 29.7
| .425 vs .419
|-
| 1999
| V. Johnson (13.3)
| S. Wicks (7.0)
| T. Weatherspoon (6.4)
| 67.8 vs 65.3
| 29.5 vs 30.7
| .418 vs .412
|-

|-
! style="width:8%;" |PPG
! style="width:8%;" |RPG
! style="width:8%;" |APG
! style="width:8%;" |PPG
! style="width:8%;" |RPG
! style="width:8%;" |FG%
|-
| 2000
| T. Phillips (13.8)
| T. Phillips (8.0)
| T. Weatherspoon (6.4)
| 67.1 vs 63.6
| 29.4 vs 30.2
| .436 vs .407
|-
| 2001
| T. Phillips (15.3)
| T. Phillips (8.0)
| T. Weatherspoon (6.3)
| 67.6 vs 65.1
| 28.6 vs 30.7
| .456 vs .423
|-
| 2002
| T. Phillips (14.1)
| T. Phillips (7.0)
| T. Weatherspoon (5.7)
| 65.3 vs 63.0
| 27.2 vs 30.0
| .444 vs .399
|-
| 2003
| B. Hammon (14.7)
| T. Phillips (8.5)
| T. Weatherspoon (4.4)
| 66.0 vs 66.4
| 28.1 vs 31.2
| .429 vs .419
|-
| 2004
| B. Hammon (13.5)
| E. Baranova (7.2)
| B. Hammon (4.4)
| 66.2 vs 67.6
| 29.5 vs 32.4
| .424 vs .414
|-
| 2005
| B. Hammon (13.9)
| E. Baranova (6.9)
| B. Hammon (4.3)
| 68.1 vs 67.2
| 28.6 vs 30.3
| .445 vs .427
|-
| 2006
| B. Hammon (14.7)
| K. Schumacher (5.5)
| B. Hammon (3.7)
| 69.8 vs 78.2
| 30.0 vs 34.5
| .397 vs .449
|-
| 2007
| S. Christon (11.2)
| J. McCarville (4.8)
| L. Moore (4.8)
| 71.0 vs 73.6
| 31.6 vs 35.7
| .417 vs .414
|-
| 2008
| S. Christon (15.7)
| C. Kraayeveld (6.1)
| L. Moore (4.6)
| 75.7 vs 74.6
| 32.5 vs 34.6
| .421 vs .427
|-
| 2009
| S. Christon (16.1)
| J. McCarville (5.5)
| L. Moore (3.9)
| 73.9 vs 74.6
| 31.8 vs 35.4
| .415 vs .420
|-

|-
! style="width:8%;" |PPG
! style="width:8%;" |RPG
! style="width:8%;" |APG
! style="width:8%;" |PPG
! style="width:8%;" |RPG
! style="width:8%;" |FG%
|-
| 2010
| C. Pondexter (21.4)
| J. McCarville (5.9)
| C. Pondexter (4.9)
| 79.2 vs 76.0
| 31.2 vs 32.0
| .453 vs .436
|-
| 2011
| C. Pondexter (17.4)
| K. Vaughn (6.7)
| C. Pondexter (4.7)
| 76.0 vs 74.8
| 32.8 vs 32.4
| .433 vs .429
|-
| 2012
| C. Pondexter (20.4)
| P. Pierson (5.4)
| C. Pondexter (4.3)
| 73.1 vs 77.2
| 33.4 vs 34.4
| .425 vs .429
|-
| 2013
| C. Pondexter (16.9)
| K. Braxton (6.6)
| C. Pondexter (4.0)
| 69.6 vs 77.0
| 37.5 vs 35.0
| .404 vs .408
|-
| 2014
| T. Charles (17.4)
| T. Charles (9.4)
| C. Pondexter (3.9)
| 72.1 vs 75.2
| 34.8 vs 33.9
| .422 vs .426
|-
| 2015
| T. Charles (17.1)
| T. Charles (8.5)
| T. Wright (3.5)
| 74.4 vs 71.1
| 36.7 vs 31.5
| .426 vs .393
|-
| 2016
| T. Charles (21.5)
| T. Charles (9.9)
| T. Charles (3.8)
| 81.6 vs 80.9
| 38.6 vs 34.0
| .434 vs .413
|-
| 2017
| T. Charles (19.7)
| T. Charles (9.4)
| E. Prince (2.9)
| 79.7 vs 76.6 
| 38.7 vs 31.8
| .425 vs .408
|-
| 2018
| T. Charles (19.7)
| T. Charles (7.0)
| B. Boyd (5.3)
| 77.7 vs 84.8 
| 34.1 vs 35.2
| .432 vs .439
|-
| 2019
| T. Charles (16.9)
| T. Charles (7.5)
| B. Boyd (4.6)
| 77.4 vs 84.7 
| 34.6 vs 35.7
| .414 vs .438
|-

|-
! style="width:8%;" |PPG
! style="width:8%;" |RPG
! style="width:8%;" |APG
! style="width:8%;" |PPG
! style="width:8%;" |RPG
! style="width:8%;" |FG%
|-
| 2020
| K. Nurse (12.2)
| A. Zahui B. (8.5)
| L. Clarendon (4.9)
| 71.9 vs 85.9
| 35.8 vs 37.0
| .372 vs .444
|-
| 2021
| B. Laney (16.8)
| N. Howard (7.2)
| S. Ionescu (6.1)
| 78.5 vs 85.5
| 33.3 vs 36.6
| .427 vs .438
|-
| 2022
| S. Ionescu (17.4)
| N. Howard (7.3)
| S. Ionescu (6.3)
| 79.6 vs 82.0
| 34.2 vs 35.7
| .431 vs .418

Current roster

Other rights owned

Former players
 Elena Baranova (2003–2005)
 Sherill Baker (2006–2007)
 Kelsey Bone (2013)
 Essence Carson (2008–2015)
 Swin Cash (2014–2016)
 Tina Charles (2014–2019), currently a member of the Phoenix Mercury
 Shameka Christon (2004–2009)
 Jessica Davenport (2007–2008)
 Barbara Farris (2006–2007)
 Kisha Ford (1997–1998) 
 Becky Hammon (1999–2006), current head coach of the Las Vegas Aces
 Kym Hampton (1997–1999), current Fan Development Leader for the Liberty
 Lindsey Harding (2016)
 Tiffany Jackson Jones (2007–2010)
 Vickie Johnson (1997–2005), current head coach of the Dallas Wings
 Cathrine Kraayeveld (2005–2009)
 Rebecca Lobo (1997–2001)
 Janel McCarville (2007–2010)
 Taj McWilliams-Franklin (2010)
 DeLisha Milton-Jones (2013–2014)
 Leilani Mitchell (2008–2013), currently a member of the Washington Mystics
 Loree Moore (2005–2009)
 Tari Phillips (2000–2004)
 Cappie Pondexter (2010–2014)
 Crystal Robinson (1999–2005)
 Katie Smith (2013), currently an assistant coach with the Minnesota Lynx and a former head coach of the Liberty
 Erin Thorn (2003–2008)
 Teresa Weatherspoon (1997–2003), currently an assistant coach with the New Orleans Pelicans
 Tamika Whitmore (1999–2003)
 Sue Wicks (1997–2002)
 Sophia Witherspoon (1997–1999)
 Amanda Zahui B. (2016–2020), currently a member of the Los Angeles Sparks

Honored numbers

Ring of Honor

Coaches and staff

Owners
 Cablevision, owner of the New York Knicks (1997–2009)
 Madison Square Garden, Inc., owner of the New York Knicks (2010–2019)
 Joe Tsai (2019–Present)

General Managers
 Carol Blazejowski (1996–2010)
 John Whisenant (2011–2012)
 Bill Laimbeer (2013–2014, 2017)
 Kristin Bernert (2015–2016)
 Jonathan Kolb (2019–present)

Head coaches

Assistant coaches
 Melissa McFerrin (1997–1998)
 Pat Coyle (1998–2004)
 Jeff House (1999–2004)
 Marianne Stanley (2004–2006)
 Nick DiPillo (2005–2008)
 Bruce Hamburger (2007–2008)
 Anne Donovan (2009)
 Laurie Byrd (2009–2010)
 Monique Ambers (2011–2012)
 Lady Grooms (2011–2012)
 Norm Ellenberger (2012)
 Barbara Farris (2013–2014, 2018–2019)
 Taj McWilliams-Franklin (2013)
 Katie Smith (2014–2017)
 Herb Williams (2015–2019)
 Charmin Smith (2019)
 Kelly Schumacher (2020)
 Shelley Patterson (2020–2021)
 Dustin Gray (2020–2021)
 Jacki Gemelos (2021)
 Olaf Lange (2022–Present)
 Roneeka Hodges (2022–Present)
 Zach O'Brien (2022–Present)

All-time notes

Home arenas
 Barclays Center; Brooklyn (2019, 2021–present)
 Westchester County Center; White Plains (2018–2019)
 Madison Square Garden; Manhattan (1997–2010, 2014–2017)
 Prudential Center; Newark (2011–2013)
 Arthur Ashe Stadium; Queens (2008)
 Radio City Music Hall; Manhattan (2004)

Regular season attendance
 A sellout for a basketball game at Madison Square Garden (1997–2010) is 19,563.
 A sellout for a basketball game at Prudential Center (2011–2013) is 18,711.
 A sellout for a basketball game at Madison Square Garden (2013–2017) is 19,812.
 A sellout for a basketball game at Westchester County Center (2018–2019) is 5,000.
 A sellout for a Liberty game at Barclays Center (2021–present) is considered to be 8,000, the team's initial cap on ticket sales at that venue. The full capacity for basketball is 17,732.

Draft picks
 1997 Elite: Kym Hampton (4), Vickie Johnson (12)
 1997: Sue Wicks (6), Sophia Witherspoon (11), Trena Trice (22), Kisha Ford (27)
 1998: Alicia Thompson (9), Nadine Domond (19), Albena Branzova (29), Vanessa Nygaard (39)
 1999: Crystal Robinson (6), Michele Van Gorp (18), Tamika Whitmore (30), Carolyn Jones-Young (42)
 2000: Olga Firsova (13), Desiree Francis (29), Jessica Bibby (45), Natalie Porter (61)
 2001: Taru Tuukkanen (57), Tara Mitchem (60)
 2002: Linda Frohlich (26), Tracy Gahan (46), Dee Dee Warley (62)
 2003 Miami/Portland Dispersal Draft: Elena Baranova (11)
 2003: Molly Creamer (10), Erin Thorn (17), Sonja Mallory (24), Kristen Brook Sharp (26), Nicole Kaczmarski (39)
 2004 Cleveland Dispersal Draft: Ann Wauters (4)
 2004: Shameka Christon (5), Amisha Carter (17), Cathy Joens (30)
 2005: Loree Moore (10), Tabitha Pool (23), Rebecca Richman (36)
 2006: Sherill Baker (12), Brooke Queenan (23), Christelle N'Garsanet (37)
 2007 Charlotte Dispersal Draft: Janel McCarville (3)
 2007: Tiffany Jackson (5), Shay Doron (16), Martina Weber (29)
 2008: Essence Carson (7), Erlana Larkins (14), Wanisha Smith (27), Alberta Auguste (35)
 2009 Houston Dispersal Draft: selection waived
 2009: Kia Vaughn (8), Abby Waner (21)
 2010 Sacramento Dispersal Draft: Nicole Powell (1)
 2010: Kalana Greene (13), Ashley Houts (16), Cory Montgomery (25)
 2011: Alex Montgomery (10), Angel Robinson (22), Mekia Valentine (34)
 2012: Kelley Cain (7), Katelan Redmon (36)
 2013: Kelsey Bone (5), Toni Young (7), Kamiko Williams (15), Shenneika Smith (25), Olcay Çakır (27)
 2014: Alyssa Thomas (4), Tyaunna Marshall (14), Meighan Simmons (26)
 2015: Brittany Boyd (9), Kiah Stokes (11), Amber Orrange (23), Laurin Mincy (27), Michala Johnson (28)
 2016: Adut Bulgak (12), Ameryst Alston (24), Shacobia Barbee (36)
 2017: Lindsay Allen (14), Kai James (34)
 2018: Kia Nurse (10), Mercedes Russell (22), Leslie Robinson (34)
 2019: Asia Durr (2), Han Xu (14), Megan Huff (26)
 2020: Sabrina Ionescu (1), Megan Walker (9), Jazmine Jones (12), Kylee Shook (13), Leaonna Odom (15), Erica Ogwumike (26; traded to Minnesota)
 2021: Michaela Onyenwere (6), DiDi Richards (17), Valerie Higgins (25), Marine Fauthoux (29)
2022: Nyara Sabally (5), Sika Koné (29)

Trades
 December 15, 1999: The Liberty acquired Michele Van Gorp from the Portland Fire in exchange for Portland agreeing to select Sophia Witherspoon and Coquese Washington in the expansion draft.
 May 28, 2000: The Liberty traded Carolyn Jones-Young to the Portland Fire in exchange for Tari Phillips.
 February 24, 2006: The Liberty traded the 9th overall pick in the 2006 Draft to the Indiana Fever in exchange for Kelly Schumacher and the 12th overall pick in the 2006 Draft.
 April 4, 2007: The Liberty traded Becky Hammon and a second-round pick in the 2008 Draft to the San Antonio Silver Stars in exchange for draft rights to Jessica Davenport and a first-round pick in the 2008 Draft.
 June 20, 2007: The Liberty traded Sherill Baker to the Los Angeles Sparks in exchange for Lisa Willis.
 May 7, 2008: The Liberty traded a third-round pick in the 2009 Draft to the Phoenix Mercury in exchange for Leilani Mitchell.
 May 5, 2009: The Liberty traded a first-round pick in the 2010 Draft to the Los Angeles Sparks in exchange for Sidney Spencer.
 March 30, 2010: The Liberty traded Shameka Christon and Cathrine Kraayeveld to the Chicago Sky in exchange for a second-round pick in the 2010 Draft and Cappie Pondexter and Kelly Mazzante from the Phoenix Mercury. Phoenix received Candice Dupree from Chicago as part of this trade.
 April 11, 2011: The Liberty traded Angel Robinson to the Minnesota Lynx in exchange for Jessica Breland and a second-round pick in the 2012 Draft.
 April 11, 2011: The Liberty traded Kalana Greene to the Connecticut Sun in exchange for Sydney Colson.
 May 27, 2011: The Liberty acquired Quanitra Hollingsworth from the Minnesota Lynx in exchange for the right to swap third-round picks in the 2012 Draft.
 August 4, 2011: The Liberty traded Sidney Spencer to the Phoenix Mercury in exchange for Kara Braxton.
 February 27, 2013: The Liberty traded Kia Vaughn to the Washington Mystics in exchange for a second-round pick in the 2013 Draft.
 March 1, 2013: The Liberty traded Janel McCarville to the Minnesota Lynx and Nicole Powell plus a third-round pick in the 2013 Draft to the Tulsa Shock. In exchange, the Liberty received Deanna Nolan, a second-round pick in the 2013 Draft, and a third-round pick in the 2013 Draft.
 April 15, 2013: The Liberty traded Quanitra Hollingsworth to the Washington Mystics in exchange for the 25th overall pick in the 2013 Draft.
 April 14, 2014: The Liberty traded Kelsey Bone, Alyssa Thomas, and a first-round pick in the 2015 Draft to the Connecticut Sun in exchange for Tina Charles.
 July 9, 2014: The Liberty traded DeLisha Milton-Jones to the Atlanta Dream in exchange for Swin Cash.
 February 16, 2015: The Liberty traded Cappie Pondexter to the Chicago Sky in exchange for Epiphanny Prince.
 April 16, 2015: The Liberty traded Alex Montgomery to the San Antonio Stars in exchange for the 9th overall pick in the 2015 Draft. The Liberty also traded Anna Cruz and 16th and 35th overall pick to the Minnesota Lynx in exchange for the 11th, 23rd and 28th overall pick in the 2015 Draft.
 May 2, 2016: The Liberty traded a second-round pick in the 2017 Draft to the Atlanta Dream in exchange for Shoni Schimmel.
 May 11, 2016: The Liberty traded a first-round pick in the 2017 Draft to the Dallas Wings in exchange for Amanda Zahui B. and a second-round pick in the 2017 Draft.
 January 30, 2017: The Liberty traded Carolyn Swords, a first-round pick in the 2017 Draft to the Seattle Storm in exchange for Kia Vaughn and Bria Hartley.
 April 11, 2019 : The Liberty traded their second round pick in the 2020 Draft to Minnesota Lynx in exchange for Tanisha Wright.
 April 11, 2020: The Liberty engaged in a three team trade where the team acquired the 13th pick in the 2020 Draft and sent Sugar Rodgers to Las Vegas.
April 17, 2020: The Liberty traded the draft rights to Erica Ogwumike to Minneosta in exchange for Stephanie Talbot.
April 17, 2020: The Liberty acquired the draft rights for Jocelyn Willoughby from Phoenix in exchange for Shatori Walker-Kimbrough.
February 10, 2021: The Liberty traded Kia Nurse and Megan Walker to Phoenix in exchange for the 6th pick in the 2021 Draft and the Mercury's first-round pick in the 2022 Draft.
February 10, 2021: The Liberty traded the 1st overall pick in the 2021 Draft, a second-round pick in the 2022 Draft, and their second-round 2022 Draft pick to Seattle in exchange for Natasha Howard.
February 10, 2021: The Liberty traded the rights to Stephanie Talbot to Seattle in exchange for Sami Whitcomb.
April 11, 2022:  The Liberty traded their Second Round pick in the 2023 Draft to Seattle in exchange for the rights to Lorela Cubaj.
June 8, 2022: The Liberty traded Asia Durr to Atlanta in exchange for Megan Walker and the rights to Raquel Carrera.

All-Stars
 1999: Kym Hampton, Vickie Johnson, Rebecca Lobo, Teresa Weatherspoon
 2000: Tari Phillips, Teresa Weatherspoon, Sue Wicks
 2001: Vickie Johnson, Tari Phillips, Teresa Weatherspoon
 2002: Tari Phillips, Teresa Weatherspoon
 2003: Becky Hammon, Tari Phillips, Teresa Weatherspoon
 2004: Becky Hammon
 2005: Becky Hammon, Ann Wauters
 2006: None
 2007: None
 2008: No All-Star Game
 2009: Shameka Christon
 2010: Cappie Pondexter
 2011: Essence Carson, Cappie Pondexter
 2012: No All-Star Game
 2013: Cappie Pondexter
 2014: Tina Charles, Cappie Pondexter
 2015: Tina Charles
 2016: No All-Star Game
 2017: Tina Charles, Sugar Rodgers
 2018: Tina Charles
 2019: Tina Charles, Kia Nurse
 2020: No All-Star Game
 2021: Betnijah Laney
 2022: Natasha Howard, Sabrina Ionescu

Olympians
2016: Tina Charles
2020: Rebecca Allen (AUS), Han Xu (CHN), Marine Johannès (FRA)

Honors and awards

 1997 All-WNBA Second Team: Rebecca Lobo
 1997 All-WNBA Second Team: Teresa Weatherspoon
 1997 Defensive Player of the Year: Teresa Weatherspoon
 1998 All-WNBA Second Team: Teresa Weatherspoon
 1998 Defensive Player of the Year: Teresa Weatherspoon
 1999 All-WNBA Second Team: Teresa Weatherspoon
 2000 All-WNBA Second Team: Teresa Weatherspoon
 2000 Most Improved Player: Tari Phillips
 2001 Kim Perrot Sportsmanship Award: Sue Wicks
 2002 All-WNBA Second Team: Tari Phillips
 2005 All-WNBA Second Team: Becky Hammon
 2007 Most Improved Player: Janel McCarville
 2007 All-Defensive Second Team: Loree Moore
 2010 All-WNBA First Team: Cappie Pondexter
 2010 Most Improved Player: Leilani Mitchell
 2010 All-Defensive First Team: Cappie Pondexter
 2010 All-Rookie Team: Kalana Greene
 2011 All-WNBA Second Team: Cappie Pondexter
 2011 Most Improved Player: Kia Vaughn
 2012 All-WNBA First Team: Cappie Pondexter
 2013 All-Rookie Team: Kelsey Bone
 2014 All-WNBA Second Team: Tina Charles
 2015 Coach of the Year: Bill Laimbeer
 2015 All-Rookie Team: Brittany Boyd
 2015 All-Rookie Team: Kiah Stokes
 2015 All-Defensive Second Team: Tina Charles
 2015 All-Defensive Second Team: Kiah Stokes
 2015 All-Defensive Second Team: Tanisha Wright
 2015 All-WNBA First Team: Tina Charles
 2015 All-WNBA Second Team: Epiphanny Prince
 2016 Peak Performer (Points): Tina Charles
 2016 Peak Performer (Rebounds): Tina Charles
 2016 All-Defensive Second Team: Tanisha Wright
 2017 WNBA Sixth Woman of the Year: Sugar Rodgers
 '2020  All-Rookie Team: Jazmine Jones
 2021 All-Rookie Team: Michaela Onyenwere
 2015 All-Rookie Team: DiDi Richards
 2021 Rookie of the Year: Michaela Onyenwere
 2022 All-WNBA Second Team: Sabrina Ionescu

Media coverage
Liberty games are broadcast on the YES Network, which is a regional sports network based in New York City. More often than not, NBA TV will pick up the feed from the local broadcast, which is shown nationally. Broadcasters for the Liberty games are Mike Crispino, Rosalyn Gold-Onwude and Julianne Viani.

All games (excluding blackout games, which are available on ESPN3.com) are broadcast to the WNBA LiveAccess game feeds on the league website. Furthermore, some Liberty games are broadcast nationally on CBS Sports Network, ESPN, ESPN2 and ABC. The WNBA has reached an eight-year agreement with ESPN, which will pay right fees to the Liberty, as well as other teams in the league.

On May 22, 2019, the YES Network announced that it would broadcast 16 Liberty games for the 2019 season, adding to the network's existing basketball coverage of the Brooklyn Nets.  Previously, games had been broadcast on MSG Network.

Notes

References

 
1997 establishments in New Jersey
Basketball teams established in 1997
Basketball teams in New York City
Basketball teams in New York (state)
Madison Square Garden Sports
Women's National Basketball Association teams